Pantapin is a small town in the Wheatbelt region of Western Australia.

The town originated as a railway siding that was planned in 1912 as part of the Quairading to Bruce Rock line.
The town was initially named Ulakain, after a nearby well, and was gazetted under that name in 1914.

The name proved problematiccausing mail and goods to go missing, according to the residentsand was changed in 1921.

References

External links 

Shire of Quairading